Bullock is an unincorporated community in Granville County, North Carolina, United States. Bullock has a post office with ZIP code 27507.

References

Unincorporated communities in Granville County, North Carolina
Unincorporated communities in North Carolina